The 6 µm process is the level of semiconductor process technology that was reached around 1974  by the leading semiconductor companies such as Intel.

Products featuring 6 µm manufacturing process
 Intel 8080 CPU launched in 1974 was manufactured using this process.
 Zilog Z80 launched 1976 was manufactured in 5 µm and 4 µm.
 Intel 2116 and Mostek 4116 16K DRAMs were introduced in 1975 and 1976, respectively.

References

External links
Brief timeline of microprocessor development

06000
1971 introductions